Danzandarjaagiin Sereeter (born April 23, 1943) is a retired Mongolian wrestler. At the 1968 Summer Olympics he won the bronze medal in the men's Freestyle Lightweight category.

References

External links
 
profile

1943 births
Living people
People from Töv Province
Olympic wrestlers of Mongolia
Wrestlers at the 1964 Summer Olympics
Wrestlers at the 1968 Summer Olympics
Wrestlers at the 1972 Summer Olympics
Mongolian male sport wrestlers
Olympic bronze medalists for Mongolia
Olympic medalists in wrestling
Medalists at the 1968 Summer Olympics
Asian Games medalists in wrestling
Wrestlers at the 1974 Asian Games
World Wrestling Championships medalists
Asian Games silver medalists for Mongolia
Medalists at the 1974 Asian Games
20th-century Mongolian people
21st-century Mongolian people